Ivan Carlsson was a former Grand Prix motorcycle road racer from Sweden. His best year was in 1971, when he finished third in the 350cc world championship.

References 

Swedish motorcycle racers
50cc World Championship riders
350cc World Championship riders
500cc World Championship riders
Year of birth missing (living people)
Living people